The Penghu Great Bridge or Penghu Trans-Oceanic Bridge is a bridge in Penghu County, Taiwan. It connects Siyu Island and Baisha Main Island.

History
The idea of the bridge construction came after knowing the sea current between Siyu Island and Baisha Main Island was too harsh to sail. The construction of the bridge began in 1965 and was completed in 1970. The bridge was expanded in 1984 due to its erosion and collapse because of the sea wind. On 1 January 1996, it was re-inaugurated as a two-lane road bridge.

Architecture
The bridge was initially 2,478 meters long and 5.1 meters wide. After renovation and expansion, it is now 2,494 meters long and 13 meters wide. It has 7 emergency spaces along the path.

See also
 List of bridges in Taiwan
 Transportation in Taiwan

References

1970 establishments in Taiwan
Bridges completed in 1970
Bridges in Taiwan
Buildings and structures in Penghu County